Lieutenant William Thomas Fitzsimons (April 18, 1889 – September 4, 1917) was an American physician and United States Army officer in World War I, and is considered the first American officer killed in the war. Fitzsimons was born in Burlington, Kansas on April 18, 1889 to J.I. and Catherine Fitzsimons. Fitzsimons graduated from the University of Kansas School of Medicine in 1912 and was a member of the Beta Theta Chapter of Nu Sigma Nu.

Fitzsimons was killed in a German air raid on September 4, 1917 along with Pvt. Oscar Tugo, Pvt. Rudolph Rubino and Pvt. Leslie Woods, when bombs fell on Base Hospital No. 5 near Dannes-Camiers in Pas-de-Calais, France.

In 1920, Army Hospital 21 in Aurora, Colorado was officially renamed the Fitzsimons Army Hospital in his honor.

References 

1889 births
1917 deaths
American military personnel killed in World War I
University of Kansas School of Medicine alumni
United States Army personnel of World War I
United States Army officers
Deaths by airstrike during World War I